The 1999 NBA Draft was held on June 30, 1999, at the MCI Center (now Capital One Arena) in Washington, D.C. It was the first draft in which four players from the same college were picked in the first round, with Elton Brand (1st selection), Trajan Langdon (11th), Corey Maggette (13th) and William Avery (14th) being selected out of Duke University. It is widely viewed as one of the best draft classes, with a total of nine future NBA All-Stars being chosen, as well as three winners of the NBA Sixth Man of the Year Award—Manu Ginóbili, Jason Terry, and Lamar Odom. Six of the top nine picks were NBA All-Stars. Pablo Prigioni, who was eligible for selection but went undrafted, eventually debuted in the 2012–2013 season as the oldest rookie in NBA history at age 35.

Draft selections

Notable undrafted players
These players eligible for the 1999 NBA draft were not selected but have played in the NBA.

Early entrants

College underclassmen
The following college basketball players successfully applied for early draft entrance.

  Ron Artest – F, St. John's (sophomore)
  William Avery – G, Duke (sophomore)
  Carl Boyd – G, California (junior)
  Elton Brand – F, Duke (sophomore)
  Baron Davis – G, UCLA (sophomore)
  Steve Francis – G, Maryland (junior)
  Dwayne Franklin – F, Shaw (sophomore)
  Dion Glover – G, Georgia Tech (sophomore)
  Richard Hamilton – G, Connecticut (junior)
  Rico Harris – F, Cal State Northridge (junior)
  Kendrick Johnson – G, San Jose State (freshman)
  Jumaine Jones – F, Georgia (sophomore)
  Shaun Kenney – G, Cleveland State (sophomore)
  Corey Maggette – G/F, Duke (freshman)
  Shawn Marion – F, UNLV (junior)
  Michael Maxwell – G, Western New Mexico (junior)
  Greg Minor – G, Cal State Northridge (junior)
  Lamar Odom – F, Rhode Island (sophomore)
  Aleksandar Radojević – C, Barton CC (sophomore)
  Gene Shipley – F, San Jose CC (freshman)
  Albert White – G/F, Missouri (junior)

High school players
The following high school players successfully applied for early draft entrance.

  Jonathan Bender – F, Picayune Memorial HS (Picayune, Mississippi)
  Leon Smith – F, King College Prep (Chicago, Illinois)

International players
The following international players successfully applied for early draft entrance.

  Nikola Dacevic – F, Limoges CSP (France)
  Hrvoje Henjak – C, Split (Croatia)
  Andrei Kirilenko – F, CSKA Moscow (Russia)
  Josko Poljak – C, Split (Croatia)

Notes

See also
 List of first overall NBA draft picks

References

External links
 
 1999 NBA Draft at Basketball-Reference.com

Draft
National Basketball Association draft
NBA draft
NBA draft
Basketball in Washington, D.C.
Events in Washington, D.C.